Empire is an American comedy television series that aired from January 4 until February 1, 1984.

Premise
This series is a satire of corporate life set at Empire Industries.

Cast
Dennis Dugan as Ben Christian
Patrick Macnee as Calvin Cromwell
Maureen Arthur as Peg
Christine Belford as Jackie Willow
Caren Kaye as Meredith
Richard Masur as Jack Willow
Michael McGuire as Edward Roland
Dick O'Neill as Arthur Broderick
Howard Platt as Roger Martinson
Edward Winter as T. Howard Daniels
Patricia Elliott as Renee
Paul Wilson as Bill
Francine Tacker as Amelia Lapidus

US television ratings

Episodes

References

External links

TV.com
TV Guide

1984 American television series debuts
1984 American television series endings
1980s American sitcoms
English-language television shows
CBS original programming
Television series by MGM Television
Television shows set in New York City